The 1983 Bendel State gubernatorial election occurred on August 13, 1983. NPN's Samuel Ogbemudia won election for a first term, defeating main opposition UPN candidate, Ambrose Alli, and other party candidates in the contest.

Electoral system
The Governor of Bendel State is elected using the plurality voting system.

Results
The NPN candidate, Samuel Ogbemudia defeated the Incumbent Governor, UPN's Ambrose Alli to win the contest.

References 

Bendel State gubernatorial election
August 1983 events in Nigeria
Bendel State gubernatorial elections